Niggas Get Shot Everyday is the only extended play by American rapper Young Dolph; it was released in February 2018 under Paper Route Empire.

Track listing

Charts

References

2018 EPs
Young Dolph albums
Empire Distribution EPs